Nikola I Petrović-Njegoš (– 1 March 1921) was the last monarch of Montenegro from 1860 to 1918, reigning as prince from 1860 to 1910 and as the country's first and only king from 1910 to 1918.

Biography

Early life
Nikola was born in the village of Njeguši, the home of the reigning House of Petrović. He was the son of Mirko Petrović-Njegoš, a celebrated Montenegrin warrior (an elder brother to Danilo I of Montenegro) and his wife, Anastasija Martinovich (1824–1895). After 1696, when the dignity of vladika, or prince-bishop, became hereditary in the Petrović family, the sovereign power had descended from uncle to nephew, the vladikas belonging to the order of the black clergy (i.e., monastic clergy) who are forbidden to marry. A change was introduced by Danilo I, who declined the episcopal office, married and declared the principality hereditary in the direct male line. Mirko Petrović-Njegoš having renounced his claim to the throne, his son was nominated heir-presumptive, and the old system of succession was thus incidentally continued.

Prince Nikola, who had been trained from infancy in martial and athletic exercises, spent a portion of his early boyhood in Trieste at the household of the Kustic family, to which his aunt, the princess Darinka, wife of Danilo II, belonged. The princess was an ardent francophile, and at her suggestion, the young heir-presumptive of the vladikas was sent to the Lycée Louis-le-Grand in Paris. Unlike his contemporary, King Milan of Serbia, Prince Nikola was little influenced in his tastes and habits by his Parisian education; the young highlander, whose keen patriotism, capability for leadership and poetic talents early displayed themselves, showed no inclination for the pleasures of the French capital, and eagerly looked forward to returning to his native land.

Nikola was a member of the "United Serbian Youth" (Уједињена омладина српска) during its existence (1866–1871). After the organization was prohibited in the Principality of Serbia and Austro-Hungary, the "Association for Serb Liberation and Unification" (Дружина за ослобођење и уједињење српско) was established by Nikola, Marko Popović, Simo Popović, Mašo Vrbica, Vasa Pelagić, and more, in Cetinje (1871).

Nicholas I of Montenegro was also reflected in literature. His most significant works are the Serb patriotic song "Onamo, 'namo!" (There, over there!), and the drama "Empress of the Balkan".

Prince of Montenegro

While still in Paris, Nikola succeeded his assassinated uncle Danilo I as prince (13 August 1860). At age 19, in Cetinje, on 8 November 1860, he married Milena, 13 years old, daughter of a Vojvoda named Petar Vukotić and wife Jelena Vojvodić.

In the period of peace which followed Nikola carried out a series of military, administrative and educational reforms. The country was embroiled in a series of wars with the Ottoman Empire between 1862 and 1878. In 1867 he met the emperor Napoleon III at Paris, and in 1868 he undertook a journey to Russia, where he received an affectionate welcome from the tsar, Alexander II. He afterwards visited the courts of Berlin and Vienna. His efforts to enlist the sympathies of the Russian imperial family produced important results for Montenegro; considerable subsidies were granted by the tsar and tsaritsa for educational and other purposes, and supplies of arms and ammunition were sent to Cetinje. In 1871 Prince Dolgorukov arrived at Montenegro on a special mission from the tsar, and distributed large sums of money among the people. In 1869 Prince Nikola, whose authority was now firmly established, succeeded in preventing the impetuous highlanders from aiding the Krivosians in their revolt against the Austrian government; similarly in 1897 he checked the martial excitement caused by the outbreak of the Greco-Turkish War.

In 1876 Nikola declared war against Turkey; his military reputation was enhanced by the ensuing campaign, and still more by  that of 1877/78, during which he captured Nikšić, Bar and Ulcinj. The war resulted in a considerable extension of the Montenegrin frontier and the acquisition of a seaboard on the Adriatic. Nikola justified the war as a revenge for the Battle of Kosovo (1389). In 1876 he sent a message to the Montenegrins in Herzegovina:
Under Murad I the Serbian Empire was destroyed, under Murad V it has to rise again. This is my wish and wish of all of us as well as the wish of almighty God.

The Congress of Berlin in 1878 recognised the independence of Montenegro, and in the succeeding decades Montenegro enjoyed considerable prosperity and stability.  Education, communications and the army expanded greatly (the latter with support from Imperial Russia). In 1883 Prince Nikola visited the sultan, with whom he subsequently maintained the most cordial relations; in 1896 he celebrated the bicentenary of the Petrović dynasty, and in the same year he attended the coronation of Nicholas II; in May 1898 he visited Queen Victoria at Windsor Castle.

King of Montenegro

In 1900 Nikola took the style of Royal Highness.

According to Bolati, the Montenegrin court was not grieving that much over the murder of King Alexander Obrenović, as they saw him as an enemy of Montenegro and obstacle to the unification of Serb Lands. "Although it wasn't said openly, it was thought that the Petrović dynasty would achieve [the unification]. All procedures of King Nikola shows that he himself believed that".

He gave Montenegro its first constitution in 1905 following pressure from a population eager for more freedom. He also introduced west-European style press freedom and criminal law codes. In 1906, he introduced Montenegrin currency, the perper. On 28 August 1910, during the celebration of his jubilee, he assumed the title of king, in accordance with a petition from the Skupština. 
He was at the same time gazetted field-marshal in the Russian army, an honor never previously conferred on any foreigner except the Duke of Wellington.  When the Balkan Wars broke out in 1912 King Nikola was one of the most enthusiastic of the allies. He wanted to drive the Ottomans completely out of Europe. He defied the Concert of Europe and captured Scutari despite the fact that they blockaded the whole coast of Montenegro. Again in the Great War which began in 1914 he was the first to go to Serbia's aid to repel the Austro-Hungarian Empire forces from the Balkan Peninsula.

In January 1916, after the defeat of Serbia, Montenegro was also conquered by Austria-Hungary, and the King fled to Italy and then to France. The government transferred its operations to Bordeaux. After the end of the First World War, a meeting in Podgorica voted to depose Nikola and annex Montenegro to Serbia.  A few months later, Serbia (including Montenegro) merged with the former South Slav territories of Austria-Hungary to form the Kingdom of Serbs, Croats and Slovenes, which was renamed Yugoslavia in 1929. Nikola went into exile in France in 1918, but continued to claim the throne until his death in Antibes three years later. He was buried in Italy. In 1989, the remains of Nikola, his queen Milena, and two of their twelve children were re-buried in Montenegro.

Children

Five of his daughters were married, each to princes and kings, giving Nikola the nickname "the father-in-law of Europe", a sobriquet he shared with the contemporary King of Denmark.

 Princess Zorka of Montenegro (23 December 1864 – 28 March 1890) she married the then Prince Peter Karađorđević, later King Peter I of Serbia, on 1 August 1883. They had five children.
 Princess Milica of Montenegro (26 July 1866 – 5 September 1951) she married Grand Duke Peter Nicolaievich of Russia on 26 July 1889. They had four children.
 Princess Anastasia of Montenegro (4 January 1868 – 15 November 1935) she married George, Duke of Leuchtenberg on 16 April 1889 and they were divorced on 15 November 1906. They had two children. She remarried Grand Duke Nicholas Nicolaevich of Russia on 29 April 1907.
 Princess Marija of Montenegro (29 March 1869 – 7 May 1885) died at the age of sixteen in St. Petersburg, Russia.
 Danilo, Crown Prince of Montenegro (29 June 1871 – 24 September 1939) he married Duchess Jutta of Mecklenburg-Strelitz on 15 July 1899. They had no children.
 Princess Elena of Montenegro (8 January 1873 – 28 November 1952) she married the then Crown Prince Victor Emmanuel, later King Victor Emmanuel III of Italy, on 24 October 1896. They had five children.
 Princess Anna of Montenegro (18 August 1874 – 22 April 1971) she married Prince Franz Joseph of Battenberg, son of Prince Alexander of Hesse and by Rhine and Julia, Princess of Battenberg, on 18 May 1897. They had no children.
 Princess Sofia of Montenegro (2 May 1876 – 14 June 1876)
 Prince Mirko of Montenegro (17 April 1879 – 2 March 1918) he married Natalija Konstantinović, descendant of the House of Obrenović and second cousin of King Alexander I of Serbia on 25 July 1902. They had five sons.
 Princess Xenia of Montenegro (22 April 1881 – 10 March 1960);
 Princess Vjera of Montenegro (22 February 1887 – 31 October 1927)
 Prince Peter of Montenegro (10 October 1889 – 7 May 1932) he married Violet Emily Wegner, widowed Countess Brunetta d'Usseaux on 29 April 1924.

The present pretender to the throne is King Nikola's great-grandson Prince Nikola, Prince Michael's son.

Honours
Serbian
 Founder and Grand Master of the Order of Saint Peter of Cetinje, 1870

Foreign

In popular culture
 King Nikola and the Kingdom of Montenegro are remembered briefly in F. Scott Fitzgerald's The Great Gatsby, where its eponymous main character reminisces on how for his accomplishments and heroic endeavors during the First World War the King confers unto him the highest honor of the Kingdom, the Orderi di Danilo. Gatsby duly presents the medal for his guest to examine which reads on the legend Montenegro, Nicolas Rex and on its reverse: Major Jay Gatsby - For Valour Extraordinary.
 The character of the King in Maurice Chevalier's movie The Merry Widow (1934) is based on Nicholas.

Notes

References

Sources

Further reading

External links

 (in Croatian)
 

|-

|-

|-

1841 births
1921 deaths
People from Cetinje
People of the Principality of Montenegro
People of the Kingdom of Montenegro
Serbs of Montenegro
Rulers of Montenegro
19th-century Montenegrin people
20th-century Montenegrin people
Founding monarchs
Petrović-Njegoš dynasty
Eastern Orthodox monarchs
Pretenders to the Montenegrin throne
Lycée Louis-le-Grand alumni
Field marshals of Russia
People of the Russo-Turkish War (1877–1878)
Montenegrin poets
Montenegrin male writers
Serbian nationalists
Recipients of the Order of the Cross of Takovo
Grand Crosses of the Order of St. Sava
2
2
Honorary Knights Grand Cross of the Royal Victorian Order
Recipients of the Order of St. George of the Second Degree
Grand Crosses of the Order of Saint Stephen of Hungary
Burials at Serbian Orthodox monasteries and churches
Burials in Montenegro